Martin Hayes (1 September 1890 - 27 September 1967) was an Irish hurler who played as a full-back for the Dublin senior team.

Hayes joined the team during the 1917 championship and was a regular member of the starting fifteen until his retirement after the 1928 championship. During that time he won three All-Ireland medals and four Leinster medals.

At club level Hayes was a four-county club championship medallist with Faughs.

References

1890 births
1967 deaths
Faughs hurlers
Dublin inter-county hurlers
All-Ireland Senior Hurling Championship winners